The Sixty-first Amendment of the Constitution of India, officially known as The Constitution (Sixty-first Amendment) Act, 1988, lowered the voting age of elections to the Lok Sabha and to the Legislative Assemblies of States from 21 years to 18 years. This was done by amending Article 326 of the Constitution, which concerns elections to the Lok Sabha and the Assemblies.

Text

The full text of Article 326 of the Constitution, after the 61st Amendment, is given below:

Proposal and enactment
The bill of The Constitution (Sixty-first Amendment) Act, 1988 was introduced in the Lok Sabha on 13 December 1988, as the Constitution (Sixty-second Amendment) Bill, 1988 (Bill No. 129 of 1988). It was introduced by B. Shankaranand, then Minister of Water Resources. The bill sought to amend Article 326 of the Constitution, relating to elections to the Lok Sabha and to the Legislative Assemblies of States based on adult suffrage. The full text of the Statement of Objects and Reasons appended to the bill is given below:

The bill was debated by the Lok Sabha on 14 and 15 December 1988, and was passed on 15 December, after adopting a formal amendment to replace the word "Sixty-second" with "Sixty-first" in Clause 1 of the bill. The Rajya Sabha debated the bill on 16, 19 and 20 December 1988 and passed it on 20 December 1988, after adopting the amendment made by the Lok Sabha. The bill, after ratification by the States, received assent from then President Ramaswamy Venkataraman on 28 March 1989. It was notified in The Gazette of India, and came into force on the same date.

Ratification
The Act was passed in accordance with the provisions of Article 368 of the Constitution, and was ratified by more than half of the State Legislatures, as required under Clause (2) of the said article. State Legislatures that ratified the amendment are listed below:

 Maharashtra
 Kerala
 Haryana
 Orissa
 Sikkim
 Andhra Pradesh
 Meghalaya
 Madhya Pradesh
 Manipur
 Uttar Pradesh
 West Bengal
 Karnataka
 Rajasthan
 Himachal Pradesh
 Arunachal Pradesh
 Bihar
 Gujarat
 Mizoram
 Goa
 Assam

Did not ratify:
 Jammu and Kashmir
 Nagaland
 Punjab
 Tamil Nadu
 Tripura

See also
List of amendments of the Constitution of India
Twenty-sixth Amendment to the United States Constitution

References

61
1988 in India
1988 in law
Rajiv Gandhi administration